Antanartia borbonica is a butterfly in the family Nymphalidae. It is found on Mauritius and La Réunion. Records for Madagascar are in error.

Adults are on wing from September to May but it is commonest in February and March.

The larvae feed on Pilea urticefolia.

Subspecies
Antanartia borbonica borbonica (Réunion)
Antanartia borbonica mauritiana Manders, 1908 (Mauritius)

References

Butterflies described in 1879
Nymphalini
Butterflies of Africa
Taxa named by Charles Oberthür